Valerie Therese Leon (born 12 November 1943) is an English actress and model who has had roles in many film and television productions, including six of the Carry On film series and two James Bond films, The Spy Who Loved Me (1977) and Never Say Never Again (1983) alongside Roger Moore and Sean Connery, respectively. She also had roles in high profile films such as  The Italian Job (1969), The Wild Geese (1978) and Revenge of the Pink Panther (1978) and had a starring role in the Hammer horror film Blood from the Mummy's Tomb (1971). 

Leon also appeared in the Hai Karate television adverts in the 1970s which gained her substantial publicity. She also became known globally as a sex symbol due to her glamorous looks and attractive figure, and was often referred to as the "English Raquel Welch".

Early life
Leon was born in Islington, London in 1943 to Henry and Daphne Leon (née Ehrmann) and is the eldest of four children. Her father was a director of a textile company, and her mother, who trained at RADA, ended her acting career to become a full-time mother. 

After attending the Channing School for Girls, Leon attended the College for Distributive Trades before moving to Paris to become an au pair girl. She did a spell of modelling before returning to England.

Career 
Leon's career began as a trainee fashion buyer at Harrods. In April 1965, Leon went to an audition which led to her becoming a chorus girl in a touring production of The Belle of New York. When the tour in Britain was cancelled after some weeks, Valerie contacted Central Casting and started to work as an extra in movies - her first film was That Riviera Touch (1966) starring Morecambe and Wise, for which she was hired as a girl in bikini. Around the same time, she appeared with Barbra Streisand in Funny Girl at the Prince of Wales Theatre in London's West End.

Leon appeared in six films of the Carry On series: Carry On Up The Khyber (1968), Carry On Camping (1969), Carry On Again Doctor (1969), Carry On Up the Jungle (1970), Carry On Matron (1972) and Carry On Girls (1973), and appeared in 2 James Bond films The Spy Who Loved Me (1977) as a Hotel Receptionist and as Lady in Bahamas in Never Say Never Again (1983). Other film appearances include Revenge of the Pink Panther, The Wild Geese (both 1978), The Rise and Rise of Michael Rimmer (1970, as the secretary Tanya), a hotel receptionist in The Italian Job (1969), and a callgirl in No Sex Please, We're British (1973). The Hammer horror film Blood from the Mummy's Tomb (1971) gave Leon a dual starring role, as a reincarnated Egyptian queen. 

Leon's TV credits include The Saint, Randall and Hopkirk, Up Pompeii!, The Avengers, Space: 1999, The Persuaders, Last of the Summer Wine and the 1968 version of Johnny Speight's provocative comedy-drama If There Weren't Any Blacks You'd Have To Invent Them as a nurse. 

From 1969-1976, Leon played the woman driven wild by a man wearing Hai Karate aftershave in a highly successful series of British commercials for the product. Leon parodied her role in The Goodies episode "It Might as Well Be String" by attacking Tim Brooke-Taylor. 

She appeared in several UK national tours of plays in the 1970s and 80s, and more recently has appeared on stage throughout the UK in her one-woman show, Up Front with Valerie Leon.

Personal life
Leon was married to the television comedy producer Michael Mills from 1974 until his death in 1988. The couple had two children: a son, Leon, born in 1975 and a daughter, Merope, born in 1977.

Appearances in reference works

Filmography

Film

Television

References

External links

 
 
 Valerie Leon at HorrorStars
 Audio interview at BBC Wiltshire

1943 births
Living people
Actresses from London
English film actresses
English television actresses
People from Hampstead
20th-century English actresses
21st-century English actresses